Mariana Marcela Briski (14 September 1965 – 14 August 2014) was an Argentine actress, director, producer, screenwriter, author, and professor. She was known for her roles in It's Not You, It's Me (2004), The Wind (2005), and Salsipuedes (2011). Briski was also known for her television roles in Primicias and Poné a Francella.

Briski was born in Córdoba, Argentina. She was married to Hernán Ventura from 1988 until her death in 2014; the couple had one son, Pedro. 

In October 2004, Briski was diagnosed with breast cancer. By 2012, it had metastasised into her lungs. In 2014, Briski died from lung and breast cancer in Buenos Aires, Argentina, aged 48.

Cancer 
In October 2004, following a routine mammogram, she was diagnosed with breast cancer.
She had a history of breast cancer in her family: her grandmother suffered and healed but died many years later of natural causes.
Mariana Briski had to endure two surgeries, chemotherapy and radiotherapy.
 

In early 2011 she was diagnosed with metastases pulmonary large.
In April 2011 she went to Dr. Crescenti to help chemotherapy to which she was subjected.

Death
Mariana Briski died at the age 48 on Thursday, August 14, 2014 at 3:30 pm after a long struggle with breast cancer.
She spent a week hospitalized in the Alexander Fleming Institute in the neighborhood of Colegiales/Belgrano where her condition aggravated and ended with the death of the famous actress.
She was buried in the Jardín de Paz of Pilar on Friday, August 15 at 1 pm.

Filmography

Schauspielerin
 1985: Tage im Juni (Los días de junio)
 1992: De la cabeza (TV-Serie, 19 episodes)
 1993: Cha cha cha (TV-Serie, 22 episodes)
 1997: Mob-Cops – Unerbittlich, unbestechlich (Comodines)
 1998: Los Rodríguez (TV-Serie, 11 episodes)
 2000: Primicias (TV-Serie, 37 episodes)
 2000: Chabonas (TV-Serie, 3 episodes)
 2001: Poné a Francella (TV-Serie, 39 episodes)
 2002: ¿Sabés nadar?
 2003: Resistiré (TV-Serie, 3 episodes)
 2004: El favor
 2004: No sos vos, soy yo
 2004: Los secretos de papá (TV-Serie, 151 episods)
 2005: El viento
 2006: Chiquititas sin fin (TV-Serie, 68 episods)
 2008: Motivos para no enamorarse
 2011: El dedo
 2011: Salsipuedes

References

External links
 

1965 births
2014 deaths
Actresses from Córdoba, Argentina
Deaths from breast cancer
Jewish Argentine actresses
Argentine people of Belarusian-Jewish descent
Argentine people of Russian-Jewish descent
Argentine film actresses
Argentine television actresses
Argentine film directors
Argentine film producers
Argentine women film directors
Argentine women film producers
Argentine screenwriters
Women screenwriters
Women educators
Argentine educators
Deaths from lung cancer in Argentina
20th-century Argentine actresses
21st-century Argentine actresses